Chloé Hollings is a French-born Australian voice actress. She is internationally best known for voicing the character Widowmaker in the video game Overwatch (2016) in both English and French.

Early life
Chloé Hollings was born on April 15 in Paris to a French father and an English-Australian mother. As a child, her family moved to Melbourne.

She has a scar on her chin as a result of a childhood fall.

Career
She has trained under Jean-Laurent Cochet, Luis Jaime-Cortez, Jordan Beswick, and Scott Williams. She has performed in the theater, and voiced documentaries, advertisements and short plays. As a singer, she is a lyric soprano.

She voices the character Widowmaker in both the English and French version of Overwatch (2016), a hit video game developed by Blizzard Entertainment. Additionally, she voices the character in the Overwatch Animated Shorts.

She has written a book called Fuck les régimes! ("Fuck diets!"), published in French in 2016.

Personal life
Originally a resident of Paris, Hollings relocated to Los Angeles in 2019 for new life experiences and to be closer to her best friends among the Overwatch cast.

Filmography

Film

Television

Video games

Bibliography
Fuck les régimes! (2016)

External links

References

Living people
Actresses from Paris
Australian expatriates in the United States
Australian film actresses
Australian stage actresses
Australian television actresses
Australian video game actresses
Australian voice actresses
French expatriates in the United States
French film actresses
French stage actresses
French television actresses
French video game actresses
French voice actresses
Year of birth missing (living people)
21st-century Australian actresses
21st-century French actresses